Auction Kings is a reality television series produced by Authentic Entertainment for the Discovery Channel. The series premiered on October 26, 2010 and the Atlanta auction house Gallery 63 in Sandy Springs, Georgia, located on Roswell Road immediately north of the Atlanta city limit. The gallery has since relocated. The series capitalized on the success of the History Channel's widely successful Pawn Stars. The auction house employees often rely on experts to appraise items of which historical background is provided to the viewer. Sellers offer comments regarding the merchandise at hand both before and after the auction. At the second commercial break, a multiple-choice question about the auction house or the items is presented. The show ran its final episode on May 16, 2013.

Cast

Gallery 63 Staff
 Paul Brown – Owner. Paul is a second-generation auction house owner. He initially had no desire to pursue it as a career but reconsidered after working at a car wash. Paul took a job with his father's Atlanta-based auction house in 1989. In 2005 he bought Gallery 63, just north of the Atlanta city limits.
 Cindy Shook – Manager. Cindy and Paul first worked together at his father's auction house in the early 1990s. She functions as both office manager and inventory manager, tagging and cataloging items for each sale.
 Jon Hammond – Assistant Manager/Picker. As a "picker" Jon not only helps process items at the Gallery but will often go in search of items to sell on consignment. A college English major, he bested nearly one hundred other applicants for the position of assistant manager.
 Delfino Ramos – Repairman. Often items brought to the auction house are in need of cleanup or repairs—both major and minor—to increase their sale value. Delfino has been with Gallery 63 since Paul Brown purchased the business.
 Jason Brooks and Guerry Wise – Auctioneers.

Recurring cast
 Bob Brown – Paul's father and owner of the Red Baron antique store/auction house (where Paul worked and learned the auction business in his youth). Bob was a semi-regular on the show in the first two seasons, and featured in the opening.
 Elijah Brown – Paul's son and Bob's grandson. Elijah works at Gallery 63 part-time as an assistant to Cindy and Jon, and attends high school. He is usually seen in the background holding items up for the bidders to see at the auctions, and also does some office work. He has been featured in a few episodes, learning the auction business from his father and grandfather.
 Steve and Ernie Garrett – A pair of antique pickers from Michigan, the Garrett brothers debuted on the show in season 3. They tour the country looking for items to buy, and then sell them at the auctions for profit.
 Dr. Lori – The Ph.D. antiques appraiser (Dr. Lori Verderame, the former museum director and university professor) who evaluates many different types of objects. Dr. Lori tells the Gallery 63 staff about the history of an object and what bidders should pay for the object at the auction. She appraises approximately 20,000 objects a year to audiences nationwide. Dr. Lori debuted on the show in Season 3.
 Greg from Greg's Vintage Guitars Atlanta has been on the show several times giving advice and appraisal information to the staff when they have received vintage and newer guitars and other stringed instruments to sell at the auctions. Greg has been a vintage guitar dealer with an online presence for over 12 years.

Episodes

Broadcast
Repeats of the series are currently airing on the digital broadcast network Quest.

See also
 Antiques Roadshow
 Pawn Stars

References

External links
 Auction Kings on Discovery.com

2010 American television series debuts
2013 American television series endings
2010s American reality television series
Auction television series
Discovery Channel original programming
English-language television shows
Television shows set in Atlanta
Television shows filmed in Atlanta
Television series by Authentic Entertainment